Hassan Ibrahim Humairi (born 7 January 1949) is the head of the Iraqi Supreme Judicial Council. He has served in this capacity since February 2012.

Early career
Mahmoud was born and grew up in Baghdad before attending the College of Law at Al-Mustansiriya University, which he graduated from on 1 July 1971. Humairi worked as a lawyer for several years before being accepted into the Judicial Institute. Following his graduation, he was appointed as a Judge by Presidential Decree.

Post-invasion career
Following the 2003 invasion of Iraq, Humairi played a role in developing the idea of a mortgage in Iraq's new Civil Code.

He was appointed as the new Head of the Supreme Judicial Council in February 2013, due to a new law forbidding the head of the Federal Supreme Court from also Heading the Supreme Judicial Council. The exact mechanism used for appointing Humairi is unclear. He was later sworn into this role on 2 May 2013.

References

1949 births
20th-century Iraqi judges
21st-century Iraqi judges
Living people
People from Baghdad
Al-Mustansiriya University alumni